Caulerpa cliftonii is a species of seaweed in the Caulerpaceae family.

It is found along the coast in a small area around Geraldton in the Mid West region of Western Australia, including the Abrolhos Islands.

References

cliftonii
Species described in 1863